Peter Jaschke (born 1 March 1952) is a former West German handball player who competed in the 1976 Summer Olympics.

In 1976 he was part of the West German team which finished fourth in the Olympic tournament. He played two matches as goalkeeper.

References

1952 births
Living people
German male handball players
Olympic handball players of West Germany
Handball players at the 1976 Summer Olympics